Turnchapel railway station served the suburb of Turnchapel, Plymouth, England from 1897 to 1961 on the Turnchapel Branch.

History 
The station opened on 1 January 1897 by the London and South Western Railway. It was set on fire by enemies in the Second World War on 27 November 1940 when the nearby oil depot was set on fire, destroying the station and the signal box. Three firemen were killed trying to cool down the oil so no explosions would occur. The fire was put out on 1 December and the station reopened on 16 December. Temporary structures were put up in place of the original buildings. The station and branch closed on 15 January 1951 due to a fuel crisis. It reopened on 2 July 1951, only to closed again to passengers on 10 September of the same year. It closed to goods traffic in 1961.

References

External links 

Disused railway stations in Devon
Former London and South Western Railway stations
Railway stations in Great Britain opened in 1897
Railway stations in Great Britain closed in 1951
1897 establishments in England
1961 disestablishments in England
Railway stations in Great Britain opened in 1951